Donna S. Stroud (born June 28, 1964) is an American lawyer and jurist who was elected to the North Carolina Court of Appeals in the November 2006 general election.  She was reelected to the court unopposed in 2014. Stroud was appointed Chief Judge of the Court of Appeals by Chief Justice Cheri Beasley and by Chief Justice Paul Newby in January 2021.

Education
She graduated from Campbell University, summa cum laude, with a Bachelor of Arts in Government in 1985, and from the Campbell University's  Norman Adrian Wiggins School of Law, with a J.D. magna cum laude in 1988. Judge Stroud was ranked first in her law school class each year of law school and upon graduation and served as the Notes and Comments Editor of the Campbell Law Review.

Career
After completing law school, she joined the law firm of Kirk, Gay, Kirk, Gwynn & Howell in Wendell, North Carolina as an associate.  In 1995, she became a founding partner in the law firm of Gay, Stroud & Jackson, LLP.

In 2004, she was elected to the Wake County District Court (10th Judicial District), where she served until her election to the North Carolina Court of Appeals in 2006.

Personal life
Since 1986, she has been married to  J. Wilson Stroud. They have two sons, Aaron and Isaac.

References

External links
Official biography page
2006 Campaign site

North Carolina Court of Appeals judges
Campbell University alumni
1964 births
Living people
North Carolina Republicans
21st-century American judges
21st-century American women judges